Bishop Sarat Chandra Nayak (born 1 July 1957) is a current bishop of Roman Catholic Diocese of Berhampur in Odisha, India.

Early life 
Sarat was born on 1 July 1957 in Kerubadi, Odisha, India.

Priesthood 
He was Ordained a Catholic Priest on 25 April 1990.

Episcopate 
He was appointed Bishop on 27 November 2006 and Ordained on 30 January 2007 by Pedro López Quintana. He was recently appointed Chairman of the Communication, Laity, and Scheduled Caste & Scheduled Tribes commissions for the Orissa Bishops' Council by CBCI.

See also 
List of Catholic bishops of India

References

External links

1957 births
20th-century Roman Catholic bishops in India
Living people
People from Odisha